The Tanzer 26 is a Canadian sailboat, intended for racing, day sailing and cruising. It was designed by Johann Tanzer and first built in 1974. The design is out of production.

Production
Production of the boat was commenced in 1974 by Tanzer Industries of Dorion, Quebec and 960 boats were completed by the time production ended in 1985. The company entered bankruptcy in May 1986.

Design

The Tanzer 26 is a small recreational keelboat, built predominantly of fibreglass, with wood trim. It has a masthead sloop rig, a transom-hung rudder and a fixed fin keel. It displaces  and carries  of ballast. The hinged mast is mounted on the cabin top.

Most examples built were powered by an outboard motor, but an inboard-mounted Japanese-built Yanmar Diesel engine was optional.

The accommodations include a forward cabin with a "V" berth with a hatch for ventilation and a folding door for privacy. The main cabin has a settee double berth and a quarter berth. The head is on the port side of the cabin and has a ventilator, with the galley on the starboard side. There is a folding table as well, that stows against the bulkhead.

The cockpit is self-draining and can seat six or more adults, with a sail locker and outboard motor fuel tank locker. An anchor locker is mounted forward. The mainsheet traveller is mounted to the bridge deck and jib sheet tracks are installed on the side toe rails.

The boat has a PHRF racing average handicap of 216.

Operational history

In a review Michael McGoldrick wrote, "These boats have a reputation as a good club racer, but they are equally well known a comfortable cruising boats that can easily accommodate an average size family. The Tanzer 26 is supported by an active network of owners, and they have even come up with a new rudder design to improve the boats' handling characteristics. Boats built in the 1980's (starting a little before hull # 300) have the newer window configuration and improved forward hatch. People sailing in shallow waters will be happy to note that the Tanzer 26 has a draft of 3 feet, 10 inches, which isn't all that deep for a 26 footer with a fin keel."

In his description of the design, Richard M. Sherwood wrote, "This is a combination boat, for racing or cruising. The cockpit is large, so she is also a day sailer, with capacity for six or more. With a fairly high ballast/displacement ratio, she can be expected to be stiff."

See also
List of sailing boat types

Similar sailboats
Beneteau First 26
Beneteau First 265
C&C 26
C&C 26 Wave
Contessa 26
Dawson 26
Discovery 7.9
Grampian 26
Herreshoff H-26
Hunter 26
Hunter 26.5
Hunter 260
Hunter 270
MacGregor 26
Mirage 26
Nash 26
Nonsuch 26
Outlaw 26
Paceship PY 26
Parker Dawson 26
Pearson 26
Sandstream 26
Yamaha 26

References

External links

Keelboats
1970s sailboat type designs
Sailing yachts
Sailboat type designs by Johann Tanzer
Sailboat types built by Tanzer Industries